Bologna San Ruffillo is a railway station in Bologna, Italy. The station opened in 1934 and is located on the Bologna–Florence railway. Train services are operated by Trenitalia Tper.

The station is managed by Rete Ferroviaria Italiana (RFI), a subsidiary of Ferrovie dello Stato Italiane (FSI), Italy's state-owned rail company.

Location
Bologna San Ruffillo railway station is situated south-east of the city centre, in the Savena borough.

History
The station opened in 1934, when the railway line itself was inaugurated.

Features
The station consists of four tracks.

Train services

The station is served by the following service(s):

 Suburban services (Treno suburbano) on line S1B, Bologna - San Benedetto Val di Sambro

See also

 List of railway stations in Bologna
 List of railway stations in Emilia-Romagna
 Bologna metropolitan railway service

References 

Railway stations in Bologna
Railway stations opened in 1934